Palazzia planorbis is a species of sea snail, a marine gastropod mollusk, unassigned in the superfamily Seguenzioidea.

Description
The size of the shell varies between 0.8 mm and 2.2 mm.

Distribution
This species occurs in the Atlantic Ocean off Georgia, USA to Northern Brazil; off the Rockall Trough.

References

 Warén A., 1991: New and little known mollusca from Iceland and Scandinavia; Sarsia 76: 53–124
 Rex M., 2002: Biogeography of the deep-sea gastropod Palazzia planorbis (Dall, 1927): an uncommon form of rarity; The Nautilus 116(1): 36–38

External links
 

planorbis
Gastropods described in 1927